The 1989 Navy Midshipmen football team represented the United States Naval Academy (USNA) as an independent during the 1989 NCAA Division I-A football season. The team was led by third-year head coach Elliott Uzelac.

Schedule

Personnel

Season summary

BYU

The Citdael

at North Carolina

Air Force

at Pittsburgh

at Boston College

James Madison

at Notre Dame

Syracuse

at Delaware

vs Army

References

Navy
Navy Midshipmen football seasons
Navy Midshipmen football